is a Japanese fashion model and tarento. She is represented with Starray Production. Her activities centred on magazines and runways. She has the nickname .

After debuting at the gyaru magazine Ranzuki, since 2008 she has been acting as an exclusive model of Jelly for about five years. After becoming an existence called by a signboard model of the same magazine, she moved to ViVi from 2013.

Her younger brother is actor and former kickboxer Dyki Miyagi, who appeared on Terrace House: Boys × Girls Next Door.

Biography

Modelling career
She was posted as a reader model in the magazine Ranzuki on the occasion of the scouting received before 109 in high school and became the main model of the magazine, then it will become an exclusive model of Jelly from 2008. Since then, she continued exclusive model activities of the magazine. She was posted on the cover on its first solo in the December issue of the same year in her seventh year of the model in 2011. She was later posted on the cover on its own in the next issues of March and April 2012, and February 2013.

She graduated from Jelly who carried out exclusive model activities for about five years at the April issue released in February 2013. On the same day, on 22nd of her own blog, she announced that it will act as a ViVi exclusive model from the April issue of ViVi released on 23 February, and appeared on "ViVi Night" held in Nagoya the same day. The transfer drama of electric shock in this one week became a hot topic on the internet, and was posted as Exceptional Transfer to Jelly Model ViVi at Yahoo News.

In 2013, which became an exclusive model of ViVi, she showed her first gravure modelling with Young Magazine (No. 40) released in September. She made her initial appearance to "Tokyo Runway" in 2014. In addition, she performed various runway performances such as "Tokyo Girls Collection" and "Girls Award", and changed her hairstyle, also became the year when it was said that it was "a year of Imechen".

In 2015, she was appointed in the fashion brand "Heather" developed by Adastria, and became the first "Communication Director" of the brand. She was later appointed after receiving support from a female college student who is the main target of this brand, and will be involved in product development advice, season campaign planning, brand image construction, novelty creation, etc.

Her hobbies is playing mahjong and golf, its hobby is high and it is made to be cast to mahjong and golf programmes.

She appeared in AbemaTV's Freestyle Jan Jon Rec 2 uploaded on 3 September 2016, and won the pro-opponent and earned a prize of 1.5 million yen.

Acting career
In addition to her model activities, in 2011, she appeared in the stage drama Yakusanjū no Uso written by Hideo Tsuchida, becoming her first activity as an actress. In 2014, she played with her younger brother Dyki Miyagi on the stage play "I Want to Try Again xx!" of directed by co-star Chuji Mikasano.

Filmography

Magazines

Runways

Music videos

Jacket photos

Catalogues

Television

Others

References

External links 

 – Official blog 
 – New Style Production 

Japanese female models
People from Yokohama
1988 births
Living people